Kunowa  is a village in the administrative district of Gmina Skołyszyn, within Jasło County, Subcarpathian Voivodeship, in south-eastern Poland.

The village has a population of 489.

References

Kunowa